B-7 Pillar is located in the Lewis Range, Glacier National Park in the U.S. state of Montana. The summit is located just northeast of Iceberg Peak, and one-half mile east of the Continental Divide.

Climate
Based on the Köppen climate classification, it is located in an alpine subarctic climate zone with long, cold, snowy winters, and cool to warm summers. Temperatures can drop below −10 °F with wind chill factors below −30 °F.

Geology

Like other mountains in Glacier National Park, it is composed of sedimentary rock laid down during the Precambrian to Jurassic periods.

Gallery

See also
 Mountains and mountain ranges of Glacier National Park (U.S.)

References

External links
 B-7 Pillar rock climbing: Mountainproject.com

Mountains of Glacier County, Montana
Mountains of Glacier National Park (U.S.)
Lewis Range